St. Peter is a historic Great Lakes schooner that shipwrecked in Lake Ontario near Pultneyville in Wayne County, New York. She was built in 1873 and measured  in length,  in beam, and  depth of hold.

It was listed on the National Register of Historic Places in 2004.

References

Buildings and structures in Wayne County, New York
Shipwrecks on the National Register of Historic Places in New York (state)
1873 ships
Shipwrecks of Lake Ontario
National Register of Historic Places in Wayne County, New York